Bruno Rangel (born 16 April 1966) is a Brazilian professional darts player who plays in Professional Darts Corporation (PDC) events.

Career
In 2018, Rangel made his television debut in the 2018 PDC World Cup of Darts, where he partnered Diogo Portela. After defeating Denmark in the first round, they lost to Scotland in round two, where Rangel lost to Gary Anderson.

References

External links

1966 births
Living people
Brazilian darts players
Professional Darts Corporation associate players
PDC World Cup of Darts Brazilian team